Neochlorogenic acid is a natural polyphenol found in some dried fruits and other plant sources, such as peaches. It is an isomer of chlorogenic acid; both of these are members of the caffeoylquinic acid class of molecules.

References 

Hydroxycinnamic acid esters
Hydroxycinnamic acid glycosides
Quinic acid esters
Catechols
Vinylogous carboxylic acids